is a former Japanese football player.

Club statistics

References

External links

J. League (#35)

1989 births
Living people
Ryutsu Keizai University alumni
Association football people from Chiba Prefecture
Japanese footballers
J2 League players
Fagiano Okayama players
Association football forwards